This list of nicknamed dinosaur fossils is a list of fossil non-avian dinosaur specimens given informal names or nicknames, in addition to their institutional catalogue numbers. It excludes informal appellations that are purely descriptive (e.g., "the Fighting Dinosaurs", "the Trachodon Mummy").

For a similar list with non-dinosaurian species, see List of non-dinosaur fossil specimens with nicknames.

Ornithischians

Marginocephalians

Centrosaurines

Chasmosaurines

Ornithopods

Thyreophora

Miscellaneous

Saurischians

Sauropodomorphs

Basal Sauropodomorphs and Sauropods; misc.

Diplodocoideans

Macronarians

Theropods

Allosauroidea

Maniraptoromorpha

Tyrannosauroidea

Misc. Theropods

See also 

 Lists of dinosaur specimens
List of dinosaur specimens sold at auction

References

Bibliography 
 

Nicknames